The lake grunter (Variichthys lacustris) is a species of freshwater ray-finned fish, a grunter in the family Terapontidae. It is found in southern New Guinea and in northern Queensland in Australia. It prefers to live in still water, especially in heavily vegetated swamps, flood lagoons and small lakes.

References

Lake Grunter
Fish described in 1977